Jean Auroux is a French politician. He served as Minister of Labour from 1981 to 1983, under former President François Mitterrand.

He started his career as a school teacher, and became the Mayor of Roanne. In 2002, he was sued for corruption in his capacity as Mayor, but he was let go in 2011.

References

Government ministers of France
Mayors of places in Auvergne-Rhône-Alpes
Living people
People from Roanne
French schoolteachers
Transport ministers of France
Year of birth missing (living people)
Socialist Party (France) politicians